The electoral division of Elwick is one of the 15 electoral divisions in the Tasmanian Legislative Council. The division covers most of the municipality of Glenorchy.

As of 31 January 2019, there were 24,010 enrolled voters in the division. The current member in the member in the Legislative Council is Josh Willie who was elected in 2016. The next election in the division of Elwick is due in May 2022.

Members

See also

 Tasmanian House of Assembly

References

External links
Parliament of Tasmania
Tasmanian Electoral Commission - Legislative Council

Elwick
Southern Tasmania